The Pennsylvania Wilds, or the Pennsylvania Wilds Conservation Landscape, is a predominantly rural and forested region in northern central Pennsylvania, mostly within the Allegheny Plateau. It covers about a quarter of the state's territory, but is home to only 4% of its population. It is one of 11 Pennsylvania's tourist regions designated by the state.

The Pennsylvania Wilds comprises all of the following 12 counties: Warren, McKean, Potter, Tioga, Lycoming, Clinton, Elk, Cameron, Forest, Clearfiled, Clarion, Jefferson, and the northwestern part of Centre county.

The region includes several state parks and other tourist destinations, including Hyner View State Park, Cherry Springs State Park, Kinzua Bridge State Park, Leonard Harrison State Park, Colton Point State Park, Susquehannock State Forest, Pennsylvania Grand Canyon, and Pine Creek Rail Trail. Two rivers in the Pennsylvania Wilds - Allegheny and Clarion - are designated as parts of the National Wild and Scenic Rivers System. The West Branch Susquehanna River flows through the region.

History
The abundance of hardwood forests in the region lead to harvesting of lumber becoming the main economic driver in the area in the second half of the 19th century, when Williamsport, the county seat of Lycoming County, was known as "The Lumber Capital of the World". By the beginning of the 20th century, the extensive harvesting led to deforestation and subsequent decline of lumber industry in the region. By the 21st century, the forests in the Pennsylvania Wilds have been mostly regrown. Williamsport, population 28,437, remains the most populous settlement in the region.

The notion of the Pennsylvania Wilds was not in widespread use until the Pennsylvania Wilds Initiative was launched in 2003 to promote the region’s nature tourism industry.

References 

Regions of Pennsylvania
Geography of Pennsylvania
Allegheny Plateau